Dominika Dery (also known as Dominika Furmanová; born 7 March 1975 in Černošice) is a Czech journalist and writer. 

he published works of poetry, drama, and a memoir. The Twelve Little Cakes (2004), which chronicles her life up until the mid-eighties, is her first book in English.

According to this warm childhood memoir as a girl she wanted to become a ballerina due to her love for Swan Lake and the lovely prince that lived in her childhood dreams. From her house almost collapsing during a terrible storm to her sister Klara's promiscuous, rule-breaking ways, Dominika remained an innocent child who would bring out the light in people with her go-to attitude that everyone seemed to be attracted to.

Works 
Přebolení : první sbírka básní z období mezi lety 1991-1997, 1999
Český orloj, 2000
Křížová cesta, The Way of the Cross, 2001 (poetry in Czech and English)
The Twelve Little Cakes, 2004

See also

 List of Czech writers

External links
 ABC New South Wales - Article, photo, and audio interview

1975 births
Living people
People from Černošice
20th-century Czech poets
20th-century Czech dramatists and playwrights
Czech journalists
Czech women journalists
Czech women poets
Czech women dramatists and playwrights
21st-century Czech poets
21st-century Czech dramatists and playwrights
21st-century Czech women writers
20th-century Czech women writers